The Wonderful Day (French: La merveilleuse journée) is a 1932 French comedy film directed by Yves Mirande and Robert Wyler and starring Frédéric Duvallès, Florelle and Milly Mathis. It is a remake of the 1929 silent film of the same title. A further adaptation The Wonderful Day was released in 1980.

The film's sets were designed by the art director Lucien Aguettand.

Cast
In alphabetical order
 André Alerme as Le docteur  
 Jean Aquistapace as M. Pinède - le pharmacien  
 Jeanne Bernard 
 Lucien Brulé as Felloux  
 Marguerite de Morlaye 
 Frédéric Duvallès as Blaise - l'aide-pharmacien  
 Fichel as Le bijoutier  
 Florelle as Gladys  
 Mona Goya as La jeune femme  
 Christian Gérard 
 Anna Lefeuvrier 
 Milly Mathis as Mme Pinède - la pharmacienne  
 Marcel Maupi as Octave  
 Marthe Riche

References

Bibliography 
 Crisp, Colin. Genre, Myth and Convention in the French Cinema, 1929-1939. Indiana University Press, 2002.

External links 
 

1932 films
1932 comedy films
French comedy films
1930s French-language films
Films directed by Yves Mirande
Films directed by Robert Wyler
Remakes of French films
Sound film remakes of silent films
French films based on plays
French black-and-white films
1930s French films